Fullerton is a village and civil parish in the Test Valley district of Hampshire, England. At the 2011 Census the Post Office say the population was included in the civil parish of Wherwell.  The village lies west to the River Test, just off the A3057 road. Its nearest town is Andover, which lies approximately 4.1 miles (6.7 km) north from the village although it lies closer to Stockbridge.

Villages in Hampshire
Test Valley